William M. Ady ( – February 25, 1872) was an American politician from Maryland. He served as a member of the Maryland House of Delegates, representing Harford County in 1870.

Career
Ady was a Democrat. He served as a member of the Maryland House of Delegates, representing Harford County in 1870. Ady ran for Harford County Commissioner in the election of 1873, but lost.

In 1867, Ady sold between 300 and 400 acres of land called "Mine Old Fields" and mining rights to "Old Ridge".

Personal life
Ady married Laura G. Eicheleberger on October 19, 1858.

Ady died of pneumonia on February 25, 1872, at the age of 62. He was buried at St. Ignatius Church.

References

Year of birth unknown
1872 deaths
People from Harford County, Maryland
Democratic Party members of the Maryland House of Delegates